List of World Cup hat-tricks may refer to:

List of FIFA World Cup hat-tricks
List of FIFA Women's World Cup hat-tricks
List of Rugby World Cup hat-tricks
List of Rugby League World Cup hat-tricks

See also
List of One Day International cricket hat-tricks, including those taken in a World Cup
List of Twenty20 International cricket hat-tricks, including those taken in a World Cup